Senegambia is a region of West Africa, encompassing the modern states of Senegal, The Gambia, and Guinea-Bissau.

Senegambia may also refer to:

Political entities 

 Senegambia Confederation, a loose confederation of Senegal and The Gambia from 1982–1989
 Senegambia (Dutch West India Company), fortifications of the DWIC in the region from 1617–1678
 Senegambia and Niger, administrative unit of French West Africa from 1902–1904
 Province of Senegambia, British West African colony from 1765–1779

Bridge 

 Senegambia bridge, a bridge in the Gambia which crosses the Gambia river

Other uses 

 Senegambian stone circles, ancient stone circles in Senegal and The Gambia
 Senegambian languages, branch of Niger–Congo languages in the region

See also